The Canadian federal budget for fiscal year 1996-1997 was presented by Minister of Finance Paul Martin in the House of Commons of Canada on 6 March 1996. It is the first Canadian federal budget that was identified with an unofficial subtitle:Securing the Future.

External links 

 Budget Speech
 Budget Plan
 Budget in Brief

References

Canadian budgets
1996 in Canadian law
1996 government budgets
1996 in Canadian politics